Switzerland competed at the 1992 Summer Olympics in Barcelona, Spain. 102 competitors, 73 men and 29 women, took part in 80 events in 17 sports.

Medalists

Competitors
The following is the list of number of competitors in the Games.

Athletics

Men's Marathon
 Daniel Boltz — 2:25.50 (→ 55th place)

Men's 50 km Walk
Pascal Charriere — 4:08:32 (→ 20th place)
Aldo Bertoldi — did not finish (→ no ranking)

Men's Discus Throw
Christian Erb 
 Qualification — 55.16 m (→ did not advance)

Men's Shot Put
Werner Günthör 
 Qualification — 20.50 m
 Final — 20.91 m (→ 4th place)

Women's Marathon
 Franziska Moser 
 Qualification — did not finish (→ no ranking)

Women's High Jump
 Sieglind Cadush 
 Qualification — 1.86 m (→ did not advance)

Badminton

Canoeing

Cycling

Thirteen cyclists, ten men and three women, represented Switzerland in 1992.

Men's road race
 Urs Güller
 Roland Meier
 Armin Meier

Men's team time trial
 Thomas Boutellier
 Roland Meier
 Beat Meister
 Theodor Rinderknecht

Men's sprint
 Rolf Furrer

Men's 1 km time trial
 Rocco Travella

Men's individual pursuit
 Viktor Kunz

Men's points race
 Andreas Aeschbach

Women's road race
 Luzia Zberg — 2:05:03 (→ 8th place)
 Petra Walczewski — 2:05:03 (→ 22nd place)
 Barbara Heeb — 2:09:42 (→ 43rd place)

Diving

Women's 3m Springboard
 Catherine Aviolat
 Preliminary Round — 239.49 points (→ did not advance, 27th place)

Women's 10m Platform
Yvonne Kostenberger
Preliminary Round — 264.81 points (→ did not advance, 22nd place)

Equestrianism

Fencing

Three male fencers represented Switzerland in 1992.

Men's épée
 Olivier Jacquet
 André Kuhn
 Daniel Lang

Gymnastics

Judo

Modern pentathlon

One male pentathlete represented Switzerland in 1992.

Individual
 Peter Steinmann

Rowing

Sailing

Shooting

Swimming

Men's 50m Freestyle
 Dano Halsall
 Heat – 23.15
 B-Final – 23.18 (→ 16th place)
 Stéphane Volery
 Heat – 23.47 (→ did not advance, 25th place)

Men's 100m Freestyle
 Stéphane Volery
 Heat – 51.05 (→ did not advance, 23rd place)

Women's 50m Freestyle
 Eva Gysling
 Heat – 27.21 (→ did not advance, 33rd place)

Women's 100m Backstroke
 Eva Gysling
 Heat – 1:04.50 (→ did not advance, 21st place)
 Nathalie Wunderlich
 Heat – 1:05.75 (→ did not advance, 32nd place)

Women's 200m Backstroke
 Nathalie Wunderlich
 Heat – 2:16.07
 B-Final – 2:19.70 (→ 16th place)

Women's 200m Individual Medley
 Nathalie Wunderlich
 Heat – 2:23.18 (→ did not advance, 29th place)

Synchronized swimming

Three synchronized swimmers represented Switzerland in 1992.

Women's solo
 Claudia Peczinka
 Caroline Imoberdorf
 Rahel Hobi

Women's duet
 Claudia Peczinka
 Caroline Imoberdorf

Tennis

Men

Women

Wrestling

References

Nations at the 1992 Summer Olympics
1992
1992 in Swiss sport